Alexandre Marnier-Lapostolle developed Grand Marnier, an orange-flavored cognac liqueur, in 1880. He learned how to distill from his father, a wine-and-spirit merchant.

References
 Profile Grand Marnier

French distillers
Year of death missing
Year of birth missing